Oasis 21 is a modern facility located adjacent to Nagoya TV Tower in Sakae, Nagoya which was opened to the public in 2002. It contains restaurants, stores, and a bus terminal, as well as an area for tourist information. 

The building is mostly underground, constructed in front of the Aichi Arts Center and facing the Hisaya Ōdori Park.

The roof is a large oval glass structure that floats above ground level.

External links 

 Homepage of Oasis 21 
 Homepage of Oasis21 
 Japan-Guide.Com

Buildings and structures in Nagoya
Sakae, Nagoya